Strickler–Louderback House is a historic home located near Shenandoah, Page County, Virginia. It was built in 1852, and is a two-story, five bay, brick dwelling with a two-story rear ell. It has a metal-sheathed gable roof, gable-end chimneys, and a one-story Greek Revival style front porch.  The interior features Federal and Greek Revival style decorative detailing.  It was renovated in 1989–1993. Also on the property are the contributing "L"-shaped outbuilding, grape arbor, chicken house, and family cemetery.

It was listed on the National Register of Historic Places in 2000.

References

Houses on the National Register of Historic Places in Virginia
Federal architecture in Virginia
Greek Revival houses in Virginia
Houses completed in 1852
Houses in Page County, Virginia
National Register of Historic Places in Page County, Virginia
1852 establishments in Virginia